Nathan Freer (born 21 May 1989), also known by the nickname of "Iron-wolf", is a former professional rugby league footballer who played in the 2000s and 2010s.

Playing career
Freer progressed through the Hull F.C. Academy ranks. An imposing figure on the field he has a fiery reputation. Nathan Freer won promotion from National League Two to National League One with Doncaster during 2008, he won promotion from Championship 1 to Championship with York City Knights during 2010, he made his début for the Featherstone Rovers on Wednesday 15 February 2012, and he played his last match for the Featherstone Rovers during 2012. He returned to York City Knights where they were looking for promotion back into the Championship.

References

External links
(archived by web.archive.org) Stats → Past Players → "F"
(archived by web.archive.org) Statistics at hullfc.com
Profile at yorkcityknights.co.uk
Profile at featherstonerovers.net

1989 births
Living people
Doncaster R.L.F.C. players
English rugby league players
Featherstone Rovers players
Hull F.C. players
Place of birth missing (living people)
Rugby league props
York City Knights players